Sharovisaurus is an extinct genus of scincomorph lizard from the Late Jurassic of Kazakhstan. It belongs to an extinct family of Mesozoic lizards called Paramacellodidae, which existed across most of Laurasia during the Late Jurassic and Early Cretaceous. The type and only species is Sharovisaurus karatauensis, named in 1984 on the basis of a nearly complete articulated skeleton from the Oxfordian-aged Karabastau Formation. The back and tail of the skeleton are covered in rectangular-shaped bony plates called osteoderms, which have a similar arrangement to those of modern skinks. At  in length from the tip of its snout to the base of its tail, Sharovisaurus was one of the largest paramacellodids. Like other paramacellodids it had relatively short and robust limbs in comparison to the rest of its body.

References

Late Jurassic reptiles of Asia
Jurassic lizards
Fossil taxa described in 1984